Horringford railway station was an intermediate station situated on the edge of Horringford village on the line from Newport to Sandown incorporated by the Isle of Wight (Newport Junction) Railway in 1868.

History
An unofficial passenger service operated by the contractor ran from 28th May until 27th July 1872. The station was officially opened in 1875 and closed 81 years later in 1956. In its early years it was busy on market days when farmers took their cattle to Newport market, and in later years it carried the local sugar beet trade. The station survives as a private house.

Stationmasters
Frederick George Drudge ca. 1881 - 1889 (formerly station master at Haven Street, afterwards station master at Freshwater)
Mr. Tutton from 1889
F. Drake ca. 1906
Frederick Dew ca. 1910 ca. 1915

See also 

 List of closed railway stations in Britain

References

External links 
 Subterranea Britannica's page on Horringford

Disused railway stations on the Isle of Wight
Former Isle of Wight Central Railway stations
Railway stations in Great Britain opened in 1875
Railway stations in Great Britain closed in 1956